The Initial Review of Westminster constituencies was passed in 1948. It was the first review conducted following the passage of the House of Commons (Redistribution of Seats) Act 1944 which codified the rules governing the boundary review process within the UK.

Changes in representation 
The Initial Review introduced the following changes in parliamentary seats compared to 1945:

References

External links 
 Boundary Commission for England
 Boundary Commission for Scotland
 Boundary Commission for Wales
 Boundary Commission for Northern Ireland

Periodic Reviews of Westminster constituencies
Constituencies of the Parliament of the United Kingdom